Fatih Sultan Muhammad is a feature-length animated film about the Fall of Constantinople to Ottoman Sultan Muhammad II, narrated from the Ottoman perspective.

The original film was in Turkish – an English translation was produced by Astrolabe Pictures , a small firm based in Herndon, Virginia marketing films to American Muslims. This film talks about the struggles the Turkish people had faced in order to conquer Constantinople (Istanbul).

See also 
 List of Islamic films
 List of animated Islamic films
 The Boy and the King
 The Jar: A Tale From the East

External links
 IMDb 
 Astrolabe Pictures

1983 animated films
1983 films
Islamic animated films
Turkish animated films